Just Like You is the third studio album by American rock band Falling in Reverse. The album had a full stream uploaded to Falling in Reverse's website on February 17, 2015, and was later officially released through Epitaph Records on February 24, 2015. It is the last album to feature lead guitarist Jacky Vincent who announced his departure in late 2015 and would be replaced by Christian Thompson. The album featured the return of the band's former sound after their previous album, Fashionably Late, had a mix of rock and rap. The album is the first to be recorded without an official bassist, with Charles Kallaghan Massabo playing bass on the record.

Reception
The album received generally favorable reviews and was much more well-received than Fashionably Late. It received an overall review of 72/100 on Metacritic. Some critics labelled it as the band's best album, with others believing that it is Ronnie Radke's best work. The album was widely hyped up to be a "sequel" to Ronnie Radke's first album Dying Is Your Latest Fashion with Escape the Fate for featuring the return of Falling in Reverse's former sound and also containing two songs ("Guillotine IV (The Final Chapter)" and "My Apocalypse II") that serve as sequels to the original songs included in Dying Is Your Latest Fashion.

Alternative Press said that "Falling In Reverse have given fans the rare gift of an artist stepping back to the sound they originally fell in love with.", giving the album a rating of 90/100. Revolver Magazine gave it a great review of 90/100, saying "Post-hardcore fans will certainly enjoy what is Falling in Reverse’s strongest record to date." Some other critics agreed, yet not as strongly; for example, Sputnik Music said that the album was "the best Falling in Reverse songs" but with "a few exceptions", and gave it an average score of 66/100.

Despite general favorable reviews, there are some critics that did not give any sort of praise on the album. For instance, one critic from Punk News' website was straightforward in their review by saying "Seems like a deliberate maintenance to cash in on the Warped Tour crowd because there's no substance, nor any style, to this record, as has been the case for FIR for years now.", giving the album a very low score of 10/100.

The album was ranked number 50 on Rock Sound's list of top 50 releases for 2015.

Track listing

Personnel
"Just Like You" album personnel as listed on AllMusic

Falling in Reverse
 Ronnie Radke – lead vocals, piano
 Jacky Vincent – lead guitar, backing vocals               
 Derek Jones – rhythm guitar, vocals
 Ryan Seaman – drums, percussion, vocals 

Additional personnel
 Michael "Elvis" Baskette – production, mixing, programming, guitar
 Max Green – bass guitar, vocals (uncredited, left during recording)
 Kris Giddens – assistant engineering
 Kevin Thomas – assistant engineering
 Jared Lucas – assistant engineering
 Ivan Wayman – assistant engineering
 Charles Kallaghan Massabo – bass, programming, synthesizer, additional production 
 Brett Gurewitz – art direction 
 Rowan Daly – cover photography and styling
 Felisha Tolentino – band photography 
 Jason Link – album layout 
 Marina Mendes – cover model

Charts

Weekly charts

Year-end charts

References

Sources

 

2015 albums
Epitaph Records albums
Falling in Reverse albums
Albums produced by Michael Baskette
Metalcore albums
Hard rock albums
Post-hardcore albums